The Hamina Tattoo is a biannual military event in Hamina, Finland. It is the official military tattoo of the Finnish Defense Forces. It was established in 1990. The event has usually taken place in July or August. It was established as a result of an idea proposed in the early 1980s. The main venue of the tattoo has been Hamina Fortress since 1998.

Notable participants

Kaartin Soittokunta
Conscript Band of the Finnish Defence Forces
Hungarian Defense Forces Central Military Band
Iron Wolf Military Band
Central Military Band of the Ministry of Defense of Russia

References 

Military music
Events in Finland
Music festivals established in 1990
1990 establishments in Finland
Annual events in Finland
Military of Finland
Festivals in Finland
Music festivals in Finland
Military tattoos